Allan Phillips was born in Maracaibo, Venezuela. He is a music producer, composer, arranger, and musician now residing in Southern California. His musical style is a blend of contemporary music with ethnic elements from around the world. In 2011, his composition Moon/Luna Llena was chosen as a wake up call song for the astronauts aboard the Space Shuttle Endeavour’s STS-134 mission commanded by Capt. Mark Kelly. Also in 2011, music he composed and produced for Clark Marketing Solutions earned three Awards of Distinction from the 2011 Communicator Awards in the categories  of audio production, jingle production  and video production/use of graphics  for work created for automotive client Diamond Valley Honda.

Biography
Born in Maracaibo, Venezuela. Allan Phillips' early musical roots are in Afro-indigenous street music, and over the years he has expanded his craft onto a blend of Latin, pop, funk, jazz, African, hip hop, dance, Caribbean/reggae, rock, soul/R&B, Brazilian, Mediterranean, Asian, European, country, ambient/new age, and classical.

Currently Performs with:
 The Soul Collective
 Gene Perry
 Sol e Mar
 Peter Pupping

Compositions/arrangements and orchestrations
 Composed and produced the music score for season 1 and 2 of the PBS series Grannies on Safari.
 Arranged and produced the music for the Macy's Thanksgiving Day Parade in New York and The Rose Parade in Pasadena, CA., 2008
 Film:
 World Dance Workout (DVD), 2006
 Tijuana Jews (feature), 2005
 Family Values in the Goddess Years, 1999
 Love Always (feature), 1996
 Break of Dawn (feature), 1988
 Theatre:
 Rule My World (Urban Opera), 2009
 The New Mambo Kings (Musical), 2009
 Latin Gems (Musical), 2004
 Latin Twist (Musical), 2000
 Blood Wedding (Play), 1983

Discography and Production

Awards and nominations
 Produced Eva Ayllon album Kimba Fa, which was nominated for a 2009 Latin Grammy nomination in the Best Folk Album category
 2008 Emmy for the musical score of Grannies on Safari
 Allan Phillips was part of Alex Acuña's team in his Grammy nominated album Acuarela de Tambores
 Produced albums winners of 14 San Diego Music Awards
 Winner of 5 U.C.S.D outstanding artist awards

References

External links
 Allan Phillips Official Website
 Public Television "Grannies on Safari" Packs and Emmy
 Bradley Leighton: Funky flutes with pizzazz
 Spoke

Living people
People from Maracaibo
Venezuelan composers
Year of birth missing (living people)
Male composers
21st-century Venezuelan male singers
20th-century Venezuelan male singers